Amy Beach Yates (born 30 September 1998) is an Australian cricketer who plays as a right-arm medium pace bowler and right-handed batter for the ACT Meteors in the Women's National Cricket League (WNCL).

Yates originally signed for Melbourne Renegades ahead of the 2016–17 WBBL season, but she played just one match and was not retained. She returned to the Renegades for the 2020–21 WBBL season.

Yates joined the ACT Meteors in 2019. In just her second WNCL game she took six wickets for 33 runs against the South Australian Scorpions, which were the best bowling figures in Meteors history.

References

External links

Amy Yates at Cricket Australia

1998 births
Living people
Place of birth missing (living people)
Australian women cricketers
ACT Meteors cricketers
Melbourne Renegades (WBBL) cricketers